The United States Attorney for the Northern District of New York is the chief federal law enforcement officer in 32 counties in the northern part of the State of New York. The current U.S. Attorney is Carla B. Freedman who was named on October 8, 2021.

The United States District Court for the Northern District of New York has jurisdiction over all cases prosecuted by the U.S. Attorney. Its jurisdiction comprises the counties of Albany, Broome, Cayuga, Chenango, Clinton, Columbia, Cortland, Delaware, Essex, Franklin, Fulton, Greene, Hamilton, Herkimer, Jefferson, Lewis, Madison, Montgomery, Oneida, Onondaga, Oswego, Otsego, Rensselaer, Saratoga, Schenectady, Schoharie, St. Lawrence, Tioga, Tompkins, Ulster, Warren, and Washington.

The court has offices in Albany, Binghamton, Plattsburgh, Syracuse and Utica. The court also holds court at facilities in Watertown.

History
The original District of New York, established in 1789, was divided in 1814 into the Southern and the Northern District. In 1900, the Western District, comprising 17 counties, was separated from the Northern District.

List of U.S. Attorneys for the Northern District of New York
Roger Skinner: 1815 - 1819
Jacob Sutherland: 1819 - 1823
Samuel Beardsley: 1823 - 1831
Nathaniel S. Benton: 1831 - 1841
Joshua A. Spencer: 1841 - 1845
William F. Allen: 1845 - 1847
George W. Clinton: 1847 - 1850
James R. Lawrence: 1850 - 1853
Henry A. Foster: 1853 (nominated and confirmed, but declined to take office)
John B. Skinner: 1853 (nominated and confirmed, but declined to take office)
Samuel B. Garvin: 1853 - 1857
James Clark Spencer: 1857 - 1861
William A. Dart: 1861 - 1866
George G. Munger 1866 - 1867
William Dorsheimer: 1867 - 1871
Richard Crowley: 1871 - 1879
Martin I. Townsend: 1879 - 1886
Daniel N. Lockwood: 1886 - 1889
De Alva S. Alexander: 1889 - 1893
William A. Poucher: 1893 - 1897
Emory P. Close: 1897 - 1899
Charles H. Brown: 1899 - 1900
George B. Curtiss: 1900 - 1913
John H. Gleason: 1913 - 1916
Dennis B. Lucey: 1916 - 1921
Clarence E. Williams: 1921
Hiram C. Todd: 1921 - 1922
Earle Gallufo: 1922
Benjamin C. Mead: 1922 - 1923
Oliver D. Burden: 1923 - 1936
Ralph L. Emmons: 1936 - 1943
Irving J. Higbee: 1943 - 1951
Edmund Port: 1951 - 1953
Anthony F. Caffrey: 1953
Theodore F. Bowes: 1953 - 1961
Justin J. Mahoney: 1961 - 1969
James M. Sullivan, Jr.: 1969
Samuel T. Betts III: 1969 - 1973
James M. Sullivan, Jr.: 1973 - 1976
Paul V. French: 1976 - 1978
George H. Lowe: 1978 - 1982
Gustave J. DiBianco: 1982
Frederick J. Scullin, Jr.: 1982 - 1992
Gary L. Sharpe: 1992 - 1994
Thomas J. Maroney: 1994 - 1999
Daniel J. French: 1999 - 2001
Joseph A. Pavone (Acting) 2001 - 2002
Glenn T. Suddaby: 2002 - 2008
Andrew T. Baxter (Acting): 2008 – 2010
Richard S. Hartunian: 2010 – June 30, 2017
Grant C. Jaquith: June 30, 2017 – September 3, 2020
Antoinette T. Bacon (Acting): September 3, 2020 – October 8, 2021
Carla B. Freedman: October 8, 2021 – present

External links
 United States Attorneys for the Northern District of New York official website

Prosecution
1